Dianne Cohler-Esses, who grew up in New York, is the first Syrian-Jewish woman to become a rabbi. She was ordained by the Jewish Theological Seminary in 1995. She has since worked as an administrator and educator for many institutions including the National Jewish Center for Learning and Leadership, the Bronfman youth fellowships, the Curriculum Initiative, and the UJA Federation. In 2012, the Jewish community organization Romemu chose her as its new education director.

She is married to Larry Cohler-Esses, with whom she has three children: Ayelet, Elichai, and Shira. She lives in New York City on the Upper West Side.

The art exhibit “Holy Sparks”, which opened in February 2022 at the Heller Museum and the Skirball Museum, featured 24 Jewish women artists, who had each created an artwork about a female rabbi who was a first in some way. Siona Benjamin created the artwork about Dianne.

See also
Timeline of women rabbis

References

American people of Syrian-Jewish descent
American Conservative rabbis
Living people
People from the Upper West Side
Syrian rabbis
Conservative women rabbis
Year of birth missing (living people)
21st-century American Jews